Brodie Castle is a well-preserved Z plan castle located about  west of Forres, in Moray, Scotland. The castle is a Category A listed building and the grounds are included in the Inventory of Gardens and Designed Landscapes in Scotland.

The Brodie family 
The original Z-plan castle was built in 1567 by Clan Brodie but was destroyed by fire in 1645 by Lewis Gordon of Clan Gordon, the 3rd Marquis of Huntly. In 1824, architect William Burn was commissioned to convert it into a mansion house in the Scots Baronial style, but these additions were never completed and were later remodelled by James Wylson.

The Brodie family called the castle home until the early 21st century. It is widely accepted that the Brodies have been associated with the land on which the castle is built since around 1160, when it is believed that King Malcolm IV gave the land to the family.

Ninian Brodie of Brodie (The Brodie of Brodie), the castle's last resident member of the family, died in 2003. The former family wing is being prepared for holiday letting.

The castle today 
Architecturally, the castle has a very well-preserved 16th-century central keep with two 5-storey towers on opposing corners. The interior of the castle is also well preserved, containing fine antique furniture, oriental artefacts and painted ceilings, largely dating from the 17th–19th centuries.

Today the castle and surrounding policies, including a national daffodil collection, are owned by the National Trust for Scotland and are open to the public to visit throughout the year. The castle may be hired for weddings and indoor or outdoor events. An ancient Pictish monument known as Rodney's Stone can be seen in the castle grounds.

See also
Clan Brodie
Elizabeth Gordon, Duchess of Gordon
List of listed buildings in Dyke And Moy, Moray
List of castles in Scotland
List of places in Moray

References

External links

3D model from NTS Archaeology

Castles in Moray
National Trust for Scotland properties
Category A listed buildings in Moray
Listed castles in Scotland
Inventory of Gardens and Designed Landscapes
Decorative arts museums in Scotland
Historic house museums in Moray
Listed museum buildings in Scotland